Chanch is a village in Molekhal (Salt) tehsil of Almora district in the Indian state of Uttarakhand.
Chanch is at 16.7 km distance from tehsil Molekhal, which too is small market. It is 180.8 km distant from its district main city Almora.

The Chanch village has population of 270 of which 120 are males while 150 are females as per Population Census 2011. In Chanch village population of children with age 0-6 is 32 which makes up 11.85% of total population of village. Average Sex Ratio of Chanch village is 1381 which is much higher than Uttarakhand state average of 963. Child Sex Ratio for the Chanch as per census is 882, lower than Uttarakhand average of 890.

Though the village boasts of producing engineers, doctors, lawyers, writers, teachers and businessmen, Chanch village has lower literacy rate compared to Uttarakhand. In 2011, literacy rate of Chanch village was 74.37% compared to 78.82% of Uttarakhand. In Chanch Male literacy stands at 93.20% while female literacy rate was 60.00%.

Demographically, there are only two castes in this village, Brahmins  and Scheduled Castes. Schedule Caste (SC) constitutes 18.89% of total population in Chanch village. The gram-panchayat of Chanch has developed very good forests in three directions of the village, which provide fodder, fuel, and fresh air.

With the composite efforts of Devidutt Jukundia, Bachiram Kaini, Gangadutt Kaini, Gangadutt Garhkoti, Durgadutt Isral, etc., the people of the earlier generations, who were migrant workers in Delhi, formed a socio-religious organization by the name of "Shree Dharm Seva Society Chanch" established in Delhi in the year 1946. This organization is still continuing with the zeal of the new generation and carrying out social activities and annual get together.

Chanch Mahotsav is an annual get together cultural event organized by village people's with help of an active youth group Nav Yuvak Mangal Dal, Chanch in every year from 6 to 7 June, this cultural get together events celebrate in village temple.

References 

Villages in Almora district